Streptococcus agalactiae (also known as group B streptococcus or GBS) is a gram-positive coccus (round bacterium) with a tendency to form chains (as reflected by the genus name Streptococcus). It is a beta-hemolytic, catalase-negative, and facultative anaerobe.

S. agalactiae is the most common human pathogen of streptococci belonging to group B of the Rebecca Lancefield classification of streptococci. GBS are surrounded by a bacterial capsule composed of polysaccharides (exopolysacharide). The species is subclassified into ten serotypes (Ia, Ib, II–IX) depending on the immunologic reactivity of their polysaccharide capsule.

The plural term group B streptococci (referring to the serotypes) and the singular term group B streptococcus (referring to the single species) are both commonly encountered (even though S. halichoeri and S. pseudoporcinus are also group B Streptococci).

In general, GBS is a harmless commensal bacterium being part of the human microbiota colonizing the gastrointestinal and genitourinary tract of up to 30% of healthy human adults (asymptomatic carriers). Nevertheless, GBS  can cause severe invasive infections especially in newborns, the elderly, and people with compromised immune systems.

S. agalactiae is also a common veterinary pathogen, because it can cause bovine mastitis (inflammation of the udder) in dairy cows. The species name agalactiae meaning "of no milk", alludes to this.

Laboratory identification
GBS grows readily on blood agar plates as colonies surrounded by a narrow zone of β-hemolysis. GBS is characterized by the presence in the cell wall of the antigen group B of Lancefield classification (Lancefield grouping) that can be detected directly in intact bacteria using latex agglutination tests. The CAMP test is also another important test for identification of GBS. The CAMP factor produced by GBS acts synergistically with the staphylococcal β-hemolysin inducing enhanced hemolysis of sheep or bovine erythrocytes. GBS is also able to hydrolyze hippurate and this test can also be used to identify presumptively GBS. 
Hemolytic GBS strains produce an orange-brick-red non-isoprenoid polyene (ornithine rhamnolipid) pigment (granadaene) when cultivated on granada medium that allows its straightforward identification. 
GBS can also be identified using MALDI-TOF (Matrix Assisted Laser Desorption/Ionization-Time of Flight) instruments.
GBS colonies can additionally be identified tentatively after their appearance in chromogenic agar media, nevertheless GBS-like colonies that develop in chromogenic media should be confirmed as GBS using additional reliable tests (e.g.latex agglutination or the CAMP test) to avoid potential mis-identification. 
A summary of the laboratory techniques for GBS identification is depicted in Ref 7.

GBS colonization
GBS is a normal component of the intestinal and vaginal microbiota in some women, GBS is an asymptomatic (presenting no symptoms) colonizer of the gastrointestinal tract and vagina in up to 30% of otherwise healthy adults, including pregnant women. GBS colonization may be permanent, intermittent or temporary. In different studies, GBS vaginal colonization rate ranges from 0% to 36%, most studies reporting colonization rates in sexually active women over 20%. It has been estimated that maternal GBS colonization worldwide is 18%, with regional variation from 11% to 35%.
These variations in the reported prevalence of asymptomatic GBS colonization could be related to the detection methods used, and differences in populations sampled.

Virulence
As other virulent bacteria, GBS harbors an important number of virulence factors (virulence factors are molecules produced by bacteria that boosts their capacity to infect and damage human tissues), the most important being the capsular polysaccharide (rich in sialic acid) 
and a pore-forming toxin, β-hemolysin. 
Today it is considered that GBS pigment and hemolysin are identical or closely related molecules.

GBS infection in newborns

GBS colonization usually does not cause problems in healthy women, nevertheless during pregnancy it can sometimes cause serious illness for the mother and the newborn. GBS is the leading cause of bacterial neonatal infection in the baby during gestation and after delivery with significant mortality rates in premature infants. GBS infections in the mother can cause chorioamnionitis (a severe infection of the placental tissues) infrequently, postpartum infections (after birth) and it had been related with prematurity and fetal death. GBS urinary tract infections (UTI) may also induce labor and cause premature delivery.
In the western world, GBS (in the absence of effective prevention measures) is the major cause of several bacterial infections of the newborn neonatal infection sepsis, pneumonia, and meningitis, which can lead to death or long-term sequelae.
 
GBS neonatal infection typically originates in the lower reproductive tract of infected mothers.  
GBS infections in newborns are separated into two clinical syndromes, early-onset disease (EOD) and late-onset disease (LOD).
EOD manifests from 0 to 7 living days in the newborn, most of the cases of EOD being apparent within 24h of birth. The most common clinical syndromes of EOD are sepsis without apparent focus, pneumonia, and less frequently meningitis. EOD is acquired vertically (vertical transmission),  through exposure of the fetus or the baby to GBS from the vagina of a colonized woman, either intrautero or during birth after rupture of membranes. Infants can be infected during passage through the birth canal, nevertheless newborns that acquire GBS through this route can become only colonized, and these colonized infants habitually do not develop EOD. Roughly 50% of newborns to GBS colonized mothers are also GBS colonized and (without prevention measures) 1–2% of these newborns will develop EOD. In the past, the incidence of EOD ranged from 0.7 to 3.7 per thousand live births in the US and from 0.2 to 3.25 per thousand in Europe. In 2008, after widespread use of antenatal screening and intrapartum antibiotic prophylaxis (IAP), the CDC reported an incidence of 0.28 cases of EOD per thousand live births in the US.

Multistate surveillance 2006-2015 shows a decline in EOD from 0.37 to 0.23 per 1000 live births in the US but LOD remains steady at 0.31 per 1000 live births.

It has been indicated that where there was a policy of providing IAP for GBS colonized mothers the overall risk of EOGBS is 0.3%. Since 2006 to 2015 the incidence of GBS EOD decreased from 0.37 to 0.23 per thousand live births in the US.

Though maternal GBS colonization is the key determinant for EOD, other factors also increase the risk. These factors include onset of labor before 37 weeks of gestation (premature birth), prolonged rupture of membranes (≥18h before delivery), intra-partum fever (>38 °C,  >100.4 °F), amniotic infections (chorioamnionitis), young maternal age, and low levels of GBS anticapsular polysaccharide antibodies in the mother. Nevertheless, most babies who develop EOD are born to GBS colonized mothers without any additional risk factor. A previous sibling with EOD is also an important risk factor for development of the infection in subsequent deliveries, probably reflecting a lack of GBS polysaccharides protective antibodies in the mother. 
Heavy GBS vaginal colonization is also associated with a higher risk for EOD.
Overall, the case–fatality rates from EOD have declined, from 50% observed in studies from the 1970s to 2 to 10% in recent years, mainly as a consequence of improvements in therapy and management. Fatal neonatal infections by GBS are more frequent among premature infants.

GBS LOD affects infants from 7 days to 3 months of age and is more likely to cause bacteremia or meningitis. LOD can be acquired from the mother or from environmental sources. Hearing loss and mental impairment can be a long-term sequela of GBS meningitis. In contrast with EOD, the incidence of LOD has remained unchanged at 0.26 per 1000 live births in the US. S. agalactiae neonatal meningitis does not present with the hallmark sign of adult meningitis, a stiff neck; rather, it presents with nonspecific symptoms, such as fever, vomiting and irritability, and can consequently lead to a late diagnosis.

Prevention of neonatal infection 
The only reliable way to prevent EOD currently is intrapartum antibiotic prophylaxis (IAP), that is to say administration of antibiotics during delivery.  It has been proved that intravenous penicillin or ampicillin administered for at least 4 hours before delivery to GBS colonized women is very effective at preventing vertical transmission of GBS from mother to baby and EOD. Intravenous penicillin remains the agent of choice for IAP, with intravenous ampicillin as an acceptable alternative. For penicillin allergic women, the laboratory requisitions for ordering antepartum GBS screening cultures should indicate clearly the presence of penicillin allergy.
Cefazolin, clindamycin, and vancomycin are used to prevent EOD in infants born to penicillin-allergic mothers.
Intravenous vancomycin is recommended for IAP in women colonized with a clindamycin-resistant Group B Streptococcus strain and a severe penicillin allergy.
 
There are two ways to identify female candidates to receive intrapartum antibiotic prophylaxis: a risk-based approach or a culture-based screening approach. The culture-based screening approach identifies candidates to receive IAP using lower vaginal and rectal cultures obtained between 36 and 37 weeks' gestation (32–34 weeks of gestation for women with twins) and IAP is administered to all GBS colonized women. The risk-based strategy identifies candidates to receive IAP by the aforementioned risk factors known to increase the probability of EOD without considering if the mother is or is not a GBS carrier.

IAP is also recommended for women with intrapartum risk factors if their GBS carrier status is not known at the time of delivery, for women with GBS bacteriuria during their pregnancy, and for women who have had an infant with EOD previously.

The risk-based approach for IAP is in general less effective than the culture-based approach because in most of the cases EOD develops among newborns, which are born to mothers without risk factors.

In 2010, the Centers for Disease Control and Prevention (CDC), in collaboration with several professional groups, issued its revised GBS prevention guidelines.

In 2018, the task of revising and updating the GBS prophylaxis guidelines was transferred from the CDC   to ACOG (American College of Obstetricians and Gynecologists), the American Academy of Pediatrics and to the American Society for Microbiology. 

The ACOG committee issued an update document on Prevention of Group B Streptococcal Early-Onset Disease in Newborns in 2019. This document does not introduce important changes from the CDC guidelines. The key measures necessary for preventing neonatal GBS early onset disease continue to be universal prenatal screening by culture of GBS from swabs collected from the lower vagina and rectum, correct collection and microbiological processing of the samples, and proper implementation of intrapartum antibiotic prophylaxis. The ACOG now recommends performing universal GBS screening between 36 and 37 weeks of gestation.
This new recommendation provides a five-week window  for valid culture results that includes births that occur up to a gestational age of at least 41 weeks.

The culture-based screening approach is followed in most developed countries such as the United States,  France, Spain, Belgium, Canada, Argentina, and Australia. The risk-based strategy is followed in the United Kingdom, and the Netherlands.

Screening for GBS colonization 
Though the GBS colonization status of women can change during pregnancy, cultures to detect GBS carried out ≤5 weeks before delivery predict quite accurately the GBS carrier status at delivery.

In contrast, if the prenatal culture is performed more than five weeks before delivery it is unreliable for predicting accurately the GBS carrier status at delivery.

The clinical specimens recommended for culture of GBS at 36–37 weeks’ gestation, this recommendation provides a 5-week window for valid culture results that includes births that occur up to a gestational age of at least 41 weeks  (32–34 weeks of gestation for women with twins) are swabs collected the lower vagina (near the introitus) and then from the rectum (through the anal sphincter) without use of a speculum. Vaginal-rectal samples should be collected using a flocked swab preferably, since flocked swabs releases samples and microorganisms more effectively than fiber swabs. 

Following the recommendations of the Centers for Disease Control and Prevention of United States  (CDC) these swabs should be placed into a non-nutritive transport medium and later inoculated into a selective enrichment broth, Todd Hewitt broth with selective antibiotics  (enrichment culture). After incubation the enrichment broth is subcultured to blood agar plates and GBS like colonies are identified by the CAMP test or using latex agglutination with GBS antisera. After incubation the enrichment broth can also be subcultured to granada medium agar  where GBS grows as pink-red colonies or to chromogenic agars, where GBS grows as colored colonies. 

GBS-like colonies that develop in chromogenic media should be confirmed as GBS using additional reliable tests to avoid mis-identification.

Nucleic acid amplification tests (NAAT) such as polymerase chain reaction (PCR) and DNA hybridization probes have been developed for identifying GBS directly from recto-vaginal samples, but they still cannot replace antenatal culture for the most accurate detection of GBS carriers.

 Intrapartum NAAT without enrichment has a high false negative rate and the use of intrapartum NAAT without enrichment to rule out the need for IAP.

Vaccination 
Though IAP for EOD prevention is associated with a large decline in the incidence of the disease, there is, however, no effective strategy for preventing late-onset neonatal GBS disease.

Vaccination is considered an ideal solution to prevent not only EOD and LOD but also GBS infections in adults at risk. Nevertheless, though research and clinical trials for the development of an effective vaccine to prevent GBS infections are underway, no vaccine was available in 2020.
The capsular polysaccharide of GBS is not only an important GBS virulence factor but it is also an excellent candidate for the development of an effective vaccine. Protein-based vaccines are also in development.

GBS infection in adults 
GBS is also an important infectious agent able to cause invasive infections in adults. Serious life-threatening invasive GBS infections are increasingly recognized in the elderly and individuals compromised by underlying diseases such as diabetes, cirrhosis and cancer. GBS infections in adults include urinary tract infection, skin and soft-tissue infection (skin and skin structure infection) bacteremia, osteomyelitis, meningitis and endocarditis. GBS infection in adults can be serious and related with high mortality. In general penicillin is the antibiotic of choice for treatment of GBS infection. Gentamicin (for synergy with penicillin G or ampicillin) can also be used in patients with life-threatening invasive GBS.

Non-human infections 
In addition to human infections, GBS is a major cause of mastitis (an infection of the udder) in dairy cattle and an important source of economic loss for the industry.  GBS in cows can either produce an acute febrile disease or a subacute more chronic condition. Both lead to diminishing milk production (hence its name: agalactiae meaning "of no milk"). Outbreaks in herds are common, so this is of major importance for the dairy industry, and programs to reduce the impact of S. agalactiae disease have been enforced in many countries over the last 40 years.

GBS also causes severe epidemics in farmed fish, causing sepsis and external and internal hemorrhages, having been reported from wild and captive fish involved in epizootics in many countries. Vaccination is an effective method to prevent pathogenic
diseases in aquaculture and different kinds vaccines to prevent GBS infections have been developed recently.

GBS has also been found in many other animals, such as camels, dogs, cats, crocodiles, seals, elephants and dolphins.

References

External links
 CDC—Group B Strep (GBS)
 Group B Strep Association US
   Group B Strep Support UK
Type strain of Streptococcus agalactiae at BacDive -  the Bacterial Diversity Metadatabase

Streptococcaceae
Obstetrics
Gram-positive bacteria
Health issues in pregnancy
Polysaccharide encapsulated bacteria
Bacteria described in 1896